James Dunbar Apple (July 14, 1938July 1985) was a professional American football halfback in the American Football League for the New York Titans in 1961. He played college football at Upsala College.

See also
List of American Football League players

External links
New York Jets bio page

1938 births
1985 deaths
Players of American football from New Jersey
American football halfbacks
Uppsala University alumni
New York Titans (AFL) players